Nikolaos Stratos (16 May 1872 – 28 November 1922 (15 November Old Style dating)) was a Prime Minister of Greece for a few days in May 1922.  He was later tried and executed for his role in the Catastrophe of 1922.

Early political career
Born in 1872 in Loutro, Aetolia-Acarnania, Stratos was first elected to Parliament in 1902. He was chosen as Interior Minister in 1909 under Kiriakoulis Mavromichalis after the Military League took power. In 1910 he joined the Liberal party of Venizelos and in 1911 he was elected President of the Parliament.

However, during the National Schism, he disagreed with the liberals and sided with King Constantine. In 1916 he founded the "National Conservative Party" and advocated neutrality during the World War.

Prime minister
In 1922, Greece was in turmoil as the war in Asia Minor was in a stalemate after the failure of the Greek attempt to capture Ankara the previous year. When Prime Minister Dimitrios Gounaris almost lost a vote of confidence, he resigned on 3 May 1922 (O.S.) and King Constantine I asked Stratos to form a government.  Stratos ultimately deferred to Petros Protopapadakis who successfully formed a government a few days later.

Trial and execution
Later in 1922, Stratos, along with Gounaris, Protopapadakis and others were charged, tried and convicted for the loss of the war in Asia Minor in what was known as the Trial of the Six.  Stratos was executed at Goudi on 28 November 1922.

His son, Andreas Stratos, became a prominent politician and historian, while his daughter, Dora Stratou, became an actress and important promoter of Greek folk music and dances.

Notes

1872 births
1922 deaths
20th-century prime ministers of Greece
People from Amfilochia
People's Party (Greece) politicians
Prime Ministers of Greece
Greek people of the Greco-Turkish War (1919–1922)
People executed for treason against Greece
Executed prime ministers
Speakers of the Hellenic Parliament
Ministers of the Interior of Greece
Ministers of Naval Affairs of Greece